Illumination is the sixth album by English singer-songwriter Paul Weller, released on 16 September 2002. "Call Me No.5" is a duet with Kelly Jones of Stereophonics, and "One X One" features Gem Archer on acoustic guitar and Noel Gallagher of Oasis on drums, percussion and bass.

Reception

Initial critical response to Illumination was positive. At Metacritic, which assigns a normalized rating out of 100 to reviews from mainstream critics, the album has received an average score of 79, based on 12 reviews.

Track listing
All songs written by Paul Weller, unless stated otherwise:

"Going Places" – 3:34
"A Bullet for Everyone" – 4:11
"Leafy Mysteries" – 3:07
"It's Written in the Stars" – 3:11
"Who Brings Joy" – 3:30
"Now the Night Is Here" (Simon Dine, Paul Weller) – 3:53
"Spring (At Last)" – 2:28
"One X One" – 5:35
"Bag Man" – 3:22
"All Good Books" – 3:25
"Call Me No.5" (Kelly Jones, Paul Weller) – 3:28
"Standing Out in the Universe" – 4:50
"Illumination" – 3:06

The deluxe CD release featured three additional tracks:
"Horseshoe Drama" – 3:38
"Push Button, Automatic" – 3:21
"Talisman" – 3:46

Personnel
Paul Weller – vocals, guitar
Noel Gallagher – special guest (bass, drums, percussion)
Simon Dine – effects, brass
Steve Cradock – guitar
Kelly Jones – vocals
Gem Archer – acoustic guitar
Jocelyn Brown – backing vocals
Aziz Ibrahim – guitar, sarod, tamboura
Carleen Anderson – backing vocals
Damon Minchella – bass
Steve White – drums

Charts

Weekly charts

Year-end charts

References

2002 albums
Paul Weller albums
Independiente Records albums
Albums recorded at Wheeler End Studios